Ziemiański (feminine: Ziemiańska) is a Polish surname literally meaning "of ziemiaństwo descent'".  It may refer to:

Andrzej Ziemiański (born 1960), Polish writer
Stanisław Ziemiański (1892-1965), footballer
Stanisław Ziemiański (Jesuit) (born 1931), Jesuit philosopher

Polish-language surnames